Ostia may refer to:

Places
Ostia (Rome), a municipio (also called Ostia Lido or Lido di Ostia) of Rome
Ostia Antica, a township and port of ancient Rome
Ostia Antica (district), a district of the commune of Rome

Arts and entertainment
Ostia (film), a 1970 Italian comedy film directed by Sergio Citti
A song by Sepultura from the 2006 album Dante XXI
A song by Coil from the 1986 album Horse Rotorvator
A fictional region of the country Lycia in Fire Emblem
A fictional city in the manga series Negima; see List of Negima! Magister Negi Magi characters

People
Alberic of Ostia (1080–1148), Catholic Cardinal
Asterius of Ostia (died 223), Christian priest and martyr
Hugh of Ostia (disambiguation)
Leo of Ostia (1046–1110s), Catholic cardinal
Quiriacus of Ostia (died 235), bishop and saint
Theobald of Ostia (died 1188), Catholic bishop
Aurea of Ostia (died mid-3rd century), patron saint of Ostia

Other
Bishop of Ostia
The plural form of ostium, an anatomical term meaning a small opening
The plural form of ostium (sponges), a pore present in sponges